The Centenary Vase is a Group 3 Thoroughbred horse race in Hong Kong, run at Sha Tin over a distance of 1800 metres in February. Horses rated 90 and above are qualified to enter this race.

Winners

See also
 List of Hong Kong horse races

References 
Racing Post:

 The Hong Kong Jockey Club – Racing results of Centenary Vase (2011/12)
 Racing Information of Centenary Vase (2011/12)
 The Hong Kong Jockey Club 

Horse races in Hong Kong
Vase sports trophies